Several ships of the United States Navy have borne some version of the name Powell.

 , steamship named A. C. Powell purchased by the Union Navy during the first year of the American Civil War
 , a Buckley-class destroyer escort
 , a Fletcher-class destroyer

United States Navy ship names